Sir Thomas James Tait (24 July 1864 – 25 July 1940) was  a Canadian-born rail executive.

Born in Melbourne, Quebec, the son of Melbourne McTaggart Tait, Tait entered the service of the Grand Trunk Railway in 1880, and by 1903 he was manager of transportation with Canadian Pacific Railway company.

In March 1903 Tait was appointed Chairman of Commissioners of the Victorian Railways, Australia with a salary of £3000 per annum. During seven years in Victoria he turned an annual deficit into a profit, improved and increased the railways' rolling stock, and initiated electrification of the railways of Melbourne. He was knighted in 1911, before returning to Canada.

He died at his summer home at St. Andrews, New Brunswick.

References
Australian Dictionary of Biography, Online Edition

1864 births
1940 deaths
Australian public servants
Canadian Knights Bachelor
Australian people in rail transport
Canadian people in rail transport
Rail transport in Victoria (Australia)